Carriers' Dock (or North Carriers' Dock) was a dock on the River Mersey, England, and part of the Port of Liverpool. The dock was situated in the northern dock system and connected to Brocklebank Dock to the west.

History
The dock was originally the northern of a pair of docks joining Brocklebank Dock, known as North Carriers' Dock and South Carriers' Dock.

The site of South Carriers' Dock was used for a graving dock in 1898.

From 15 May 1968 until 30 September 1972, the northern quayside of Carriers' Dock was used as a temporary terminal for the B&I Line, prior to the company using Trafalgar Dock, and for MD&HB cargo handling around the same time. The southern quayside of Carriers' Dock was a rough cargo berth.

North Carriers' Dock was filled in the late 20th century, and the site has been redeveloped.

References

Sources

External links
 

Liverpool docks